The National Recognition Medal for Victims of Terrorism is a national medal of France awarded to French victims of terrorism. Established by presidential decree on July 12, 2016, it may be awarded to French or foreign nationals who are victims of terrorism in France or abroad. The medal may be awarded to a retroactive date of January 1, 2006. The medal was created to give a proper recognition to the sacrifice of terrorism victims while still maintaining the award criterion of existing national honours such as the Legion of Honor. In Spain there is a similar honour known as the Royal Order of Civil Recognition for Victims of Terrorism.

See also 
 Medal for the Military Protection of the Territory: French military award related to combatting terrorism

References

Civil awards and decorations of France
Awards established in 2016
Terrorism in France